Major Mitchell's cockatoo (Lophochroa leadbeateri), also known as Leadbeater's cockatoo or the pink cockatoo, is a medium-sized cockatoo that inhabits arid and semi-arid inland areas of Australia, though it is seen regularly in other climates, for example, South-East Queensland's subtropical region.

Taxonomy and naming
Irish naturalist Nicholas Aylward Vigors described the species in 1831 as Plyctolophus leadbeateri. The scientific name commemorates the London naturalist and taxidermist Benjamin Leadbeater, who had given Vigors what would become the type specimen. Edward Lear painted it in his 1832 work Illustrations of the Family of Psittacidae, or Parrots. Citing Lear, William Swainson gave it the name Plyctolophus erythropterus.

Major Mitchell's cockatoo may be more closely related to Cacatua than is the galah, and that its lineage diverged around the time of or shortly after the acquisition of the long crest; probably the former as this crest type is not found in all Cacatua cockatoos, so must have been present in an early or incipient stage at the time of the divergence of the pink cockatoo's ancestors. Like the galah, this species has not lost the ability to deposit diluted pigment dyes in its body plumage, although it does not produce melanin coloration anymore, resulting in a lighter bird overall compared to the galah. Indeed, disregarding the crest, Major Mitchell's cockatoo looks almost like a near-leucistic version of that species. Another indication of the early divergence of this species from the "white" cockatoo lineage is the presence of features found otherwise only in corellas, such as its plaintive yodeling cry, as well as others which are unique to pink and the true white cockatoos, for example the large crest and rounded wing shape.

It is here placed in its own monotypic genus Lophochroa, though to include it in Cacatua as others do is not wrong as long as the corellas are also included there.

"Major Mitchell's cockatoo" has been designated the official name by the International Ornithologists' Union (IOC). "Pink cockatoo" was its official name (with Major Mitchell as an alternative) in the 1926 official RAOU checklist. The bird became linked to Major Thomas Mitchell after he described the species in glowing terms in his books on his expeditions, calling it the "cockatoo of the interior". Mitchell himself called it the red-top cockatoo. Before this John Gould had called it Leadbeater's cockatoo (derived from the species name) in 1848, as had Lear in 1832. Gould added that people of the Swan River Colony called it pink cockatoo, and recorded an indigenous name Jak-kul-yak-kul Other names include desert cockatoo, and chockalott, chock-a-lock, joggle-joggle, and wee juggler, the last anglicised from the Wiradjuri wijugla. In Central Australia south of Alice Springs, the Pitjantjatjara term is kakalyalya. Names recorded from South Australia include kukkalulla (Kokatha dialect of Western Desert language), nkuna and ungkuna (Arrernte), yangkunnu (Barngarla), and yangwina (Wirangu), and yel-le-lek (from the Wimmera), and cal-drin-ga (from the lower Murray).

Description 

With its soft-textured white and salmon-pink plumage and large, bright red and yellow crest, it is often described as the most beautiful of all cockatoos. It is named in honour of Major Sir Thomas Mitchell, who wrote, "Few birds more enliven the monotonous hues of the Australian forest than this beautiful species whose pink-coloured wings and flowing crest might have embellished the air of a more voluptuous region." Major Mitchell's cockatoo females and males are almost identical. The males are usually bigger. The female has a broader yellow stripe on the crest and develop a red eye when mature.

Reproduction and lifespan 
The bird reaches sexual maturity around 3–4 years old. The oldest recorded Major Mitchell's cockatoo died at 83 years old.

Distribution and habitat 
In contrast to those of the galah, populations of Major Mitchell's cockatoos have declined rather than increased as a result of man-made changes to the arid interior of Australia. Where galahs readily occupy cleared and part-cleared land, Major Mitchell's cockatoos require extensive woodlands, particularly favouring conifers (Callitris spp.), sheoak (Allocasuarina spp.) and eucalypts. Unlike other cockatoos, Major Mitchell's pairs will not nest close to one another, so they cannot tolerate fragmented, partly cleared habitats, and their range is contracting.

In the Mallee region of Victoria where the galah and Major Mitchell's cockatoo can be found to be nesting in the same area,  the two species have interbred and produced hybridised offspring occasionally.

Conservation status

Australia
Major Mitchell's cockatoo is not listed as a threatened species on the Environment Protection and Biodiversity Conservation Act 1999.

Victoria
 Major Mitchell's cockatoo is listed as a threatened species on the Victorian Flora and Fauna Guarantee Act (1988). Under this Act, an Action Statement for the recovery and future management of this species has been prepared.
 On the 2013 advisory list of threatened vertebrate fauna in Victoria, this species is listed as vulnerable.

Aviculture 
"Cookie", was a Major Mitchell's cockatoo and was a beloved resident of Illinois' Brookfield Zoo near Chicago from the time the zoo opened in 1934 until his death on 27 August 2016. Cookie was 83 years old and he had been retired from public display since 2009, due to ill health prior to his death.

Gallery

References

Further reading
Fluffies.org (2006): Zazu the Major Mitchells cockatoo. Retrieved 2006-JAN-14.

External links

Pink cockatoo at the World Parrot Trust Parrot Encyclopedia
BirdLife Species Factsheet

Major Mitchell's cockatoo
Endemic birds of Australia
Major Mitchell's cockatoo
Taxa named by Nicholas Aylward Vigors
Taxobox binomials not recognized by IUCN